The Grote Markt ("Big Market") is the central square of Antwerp, Belgium, situated in the heart of the old city quarter. It is surrounded by the city's Renaissance Town Hall, as well as numerous guildhalls with elaborate façades, the majority of which are reconstructions in the 19th and early 20th century, approximating paintings of the square by Flemish artists. A few of the guildhall façades, such as that of Sint-Joris's are intact originals entirely dating back to the 16th century.

The square also has many restaurants and cafés, and it lies within walking distance of the Scheldt river. The Grote Markt hosts a Christmas market and ice rink every winter.

Attractions
Attractions include:
 Antwerp City Hall, built on the foundation of a precursor
 The Guildhalls of Sint-Joris at Grote Markt 7 and de Valk at Grote Markt 11
 Brabo Fountain, created by Jef Lambeaux, depicting a city legend
 Antwerp Jazz Club (AJC)

Gallery

References

Notes

External links

 Guildhall pictures

Squares in Belgium
Streets in Antwerp
Buildings and structures in Antwerp
Tourist attractions in Antwerp